PNS Akram is a naval base located in Gwadar, Balochistan, Pakistan. Established in 1987, it serves as the forward operating base for the Pakistan Navy and acts as a military depot for all naval personnel stationed as part of the Western Command. It is namesake in the honor and in memory of Admiral Afzal Rahman Khan, and is the first naval base to be established on the Makran Coast of Balochistan.

Resources

External links

Akram
Military installations in Balochistan, Pakistan
Akram
1987 establishments in Pakistan